Potentilla incana is a plant species in the genus Potentilla. It is native to Europe, with a range stretching from France to Russia.

References

arenaria
Flora of Europe